Chikan (or ) is a Japanese term referring to sexual harassment or other obscene acts conducted against the victim's will, or a person who commits such an act. The term is frequently used to describe men who take advantage of the crowded conditions on the public transit systems to grope people. While the term is not defined in the Japanese legal system, vernacular use describes acts that violate several laws. The neologism referring to the corresponding female chikan is chijo. 

In clinical psychology, the desire is called frotteurism. While women on crowded trains in Japan are the most frequent targets of chikan, sexual predators in Japan can take advantage of people in other situations as well. One such situation (warned against in the sign pictured) is bicycle parking lots, where a molester will wait until a woman or man is bent over, unlocking their bicycle lock, and then grope them from behind. Chikan often features in Japanese pornography, along with other non-consensual themes.  As part of the effort to combat chikan, some railway companies have designated women-only passenger cars.

The term is also sardonically used among hardcore gamers in Japan to describe fans of the Xbox game consoles, as one of the first people interviewed on the original console's launch also purchased a hentai game at the same time.

Statistics
The National Police Agency reports that about 2,000 to 3,000 chikans are arrested each year. However, there are many dark numbers, with the Cabinet Office reporting that about half of women have been victims of chikan.

See also
Saikyō Line
"Otto Chikan!"

References

Railway culture in Japan
Japanese sex terms
Sexual abuse